Pulai is a suburban area in the city of Iskandar Puteri, Mukim Pulai, district Johor Bahru, state of Johor, Malaysia

Name

Pulai was named after Pulai River. Pulai is a species of tree (sp. Alstonia angustiloba). The tree can be found in abundance at Mount Pulai where Pulai River come from.

Demographics

Most of Pulai's residents are Malays (47.3%), followed by Chinese (40.7%) and Indians (11.5%).

List of development in Pulai
Taman Pulai Mutiara
Taman Pulai Indah
Taman Pulai Hijauan
Taman Pulai Makmur (BBKP)
Taman Pulai Ria (BBKP)
Taman Pulai Mesra (BBKP)
Taman Pulai Tuah (BBKP)
Taman Pulai Ceria (BBKP)
Taman Pulai Bestari (BBKP)
Taman Pulai Emas
Bandar Pulai Jaya
Taman Pulai Perdana
Taman Pulai Perdana 2
Taman Sri Pulai
Taman Teratai
Taman Desa Permai

List of Villages in Pulai
Kampung Melayu Kangkar Pulai
Kangkar Pulai Old Town
Kampung Nesa
Kampung Ladang Keck Seng

References

Iskandar Puteri